Cecil James Wallace Jr. (born April 17, 1985) is a former American football safety. He was signed by the Seattle Seahawks as an undrafted free agent in 2009. He played college football at Washington. He also played for the Las Vegas Locomotives and San Diego Chargers.

Early years
Wallace played running back and free safety at Grant Union High School, accumulating 1,600 rushing yards and 25 touchdowns  and made 73 tackles at free safety as a senior.

College career
Wallace played 45 games, including 29 starts, for Washington. He totaled 258 career tackles (160 solo), five forced fumbles and one fumble recovery as a Husky. Wallace was an All-Pac-10 performer in his senior season. Wallace majored in American ethnic studies at college.

Professional career

Seattle Seahawks
Wallace, signed as an undrafted free agent, played in nine games with the Seattle Seahawks with two tackles in his first professional season. His season was cut short due to a knee injury and he was placed on the injured reserve list on December 5, 2007.

Las Vegas Locomotives
Wallace played for the Las Vegas Locomotives in 2010 where he helped them win a championship.

San Diego Chargers
Wallace signed a future contract with the San Diego Chargers on January 12, 2011. He was released on September 13.

External links
 Seattle Seahawks bio
 Washington Huskies bio

1985 births
Living people
Players of American football from Sacramento, California
American football defensive backs
Washington Huskies football players
Seattle Seahawks players
Las Vegas Locomotives players
San Diego Chargers players